The Canton of Grand-Fougeray is a former canton of France, in the Ille-et-Vilaine département, located in the southeast of the department. It was disbanded following the French canton reorganisation which came into effect in March 2015. It consisted of 4 communes, and its population was 5,461 in 2012.

References

Former cantons of Ille-et-Vilaine
2015 disestablishments in France
States and territories disestablished in 2015